Chess Query Language (CQL) is a structured query language which is designed to allow chess players and researchers to search for games, positions, problems, and studies in a quick and relatively easy manner.

The user specifies the items that they are looking for, and the database in which to search. After running, the query creates a file in Portable Game Notation (PGN) format that contains all the games or positions matching the query criteria.

The language is designed to be extremely flexible; for example, a user does not have to define exactly the position or theme that they are looking for, but can modify the query so that it will find similar results within certain parameters.

Items and themes that CQL can search for include, but are not limited to:

 Player names
 Date and location of games
 Chess opening used
 Certain moves or combinations of moves
 Certain pieces located on certain squares
 Patterns of pieces in certain locations
 Which pieces each side has left
 Complex criteria such as king safety or certain pawn structures.

References

External links
Gady Costeff's CQL page
CQL manual and download page
A review of a chess analysis engine with CQL support

Computer chess
Query languages